The Edwards House, on Kentucky Route 745 in Green County, Kentucky, United States, near Exie, Kentucky, was built in the 1840s.  It was listed on the National Register of Historic Places in 1984.

The house was deemed "one of the best examples in the county of both the Greek Revival style and the dogtrot log house form."

It is a two-story, five-bay log house.  It has a slope-shouldered stone chimney on its north end while the stone chimney on its south end had collapsed by 1984.  It has a two-tiered portico.  It has Greek Revival surrounds to its windows and doors.

See also
David Edwards House, nearby, also listed on the National Register

References

National Register of Historic Places in Green County, Kentucky
Greek Revival architecture in Kentucky
Houses completed in 1845
1845 establishments in Kentucky
Dogtrot architecture in Kentucky
Houses in Green County, Kentucky